Tapana is a 2004 Telugu romantic-drama film directed by Tejas Dhanraj. It stars debutante Siddardha, Prabhu Deva, Maahi and Seema. The film opened to mixed reviews in February 2004.

Cast

Siddardha as Siddardha "Siddhu"
Prabhu Deva as Venu
Maahi as Meera
Seema 
Archana as Radhima
Ali as Chiru
Eswara Rao as Meera's father
Duvvasi Mohan
Anant
Vinay Varma
Deepa
Rakhi
Meka Ramakrishna
Vijayabhaskar
Raam Surapaneni

Production
The film was announced in June 2003, where Applause Entertainment Ltd revealed their maiden regional venture titled Tapana at Annapurna Studio in Banjara Hills. The film marked the debut of actress Jaya Prada's nephew Siddardha in the leading role, alongside Prabhu Deva. She had initially attempted to launch Siddardha through a bilingual venture titled Classmates in 2001, but the film did not materialise. He later made a comeback with the Tamil film Uyire Uyire, starring Hansika Motwani, during 2016.

Release
Tapana opened to mixed reviews in February 2004, with a critic from Idlebrain.com noting the "first half of the film does not have any story, hence is little boring. Things start rolling in second half. The film is good from the moment it is revealed that heroine is suffering with a disease". A critic from AllIndianSite.com wrote "Dhanraj's direction was not impressive, the entire film was narrated very slowly. It was more like a TV serial than a film".

Soundtrack 
An audio release event was held in December 2003 at Taj Krishna Hotel with Sonali Bendre in attendance as the chief guest.

References

2004 films
2000s Telugu-language films